Hulodes is a genus of moths in the family Erebidae first described by Achille Guenée in 1852.

Description
Palpi with second joint reaching vertex of head, and third joint minute in male and moderate length in female. Antennae simple. Thorax and abdomen clothed with coarse hair. Tibia spineless. Male with tibia, first tarsal joint of mid-legs and all joints of hindlegs are fringed with long hair. Forewings with arched costa towards apex, which is somewhat falcate. Hindwings with short cell. Vein 5 from close to lower angle. Larva with four pairs of abdominal prolegs, where the first pair rudimentary.

Species
 Hulodes caranea Cramer, [1780]
 Hulodes donata Schultze, 1907
 Hulodes drylla Guenée, 1852
 Hulodes gravata Prout, 1932
 Hulodes ischnesthes Prout, 1932
 Hulodes saturnioides Guenée, 1852
 Hulodes solomonensis Hampson, 1926

Former species
 Hulodes angulata Prout, 1928
 Hulodes fusifascia (Walker, 1869)
 Hulodes hilaris Prout, 1921

References

External links

 
 
 Holloway, Jeremy Daniel "Hulodes Guenée". The Moths of Borneo. Retrieved January 16, 2019.

 
Hulodini
Moth genera